Manjul Publishing House Pvt. Ltd (also known as Manjul Publications) is a publishing house in Bhopal, India. It is well known for the translation of the Harry Potter novels into Hindi. It was established in 1999.

Major published books 
Harry Potter series
 हैरी पॉटर और पारस पत्थर Harry Potter aur Paaras Pathar (2002, November)(eng) Harry Potter and the Philosopher's Stone
 हैरी पॉटर और रहस्यमयी तहख़ाना Harry Potter aur Rahasyamayi Tehkhana (2005, July)(eng) Harry Potter and the Chamber of Secrets
 हैरी पॉटर और अज़्काबान का क़ैदी Harry Potter aur Azkaabaan ka Qaidi (2006, February)(eng) Harry Potter and the Prisoner of Azkaban
 हैरी पॉटर और आग का प्याला Harry Potter aur Aag ka Pyaala (2006, July)(eng) Harry Potter and the Goblet of Fire
 हैरी पॉटर और मयापंछी का समूह Harry Potter aur Mayapanchhi ka Samooh (July, 2007)(eng) Harry Potter and the Order of the Phoenix
 हैरी पॉटर और हाफ़ ब्लड प्रिंस Harry Potter aur Half-Blood Prince (September, 2007)(eng) Harry Potter and the Half-Blood Prince
 हैरी पॉटर और मौत के तोहफ़े Harry Potter aur Maut Ke Tohfe (June 2008)(eng) Harry Potter and the Deathly Hallows
Other notable novels:
 Dictionary of Philosophy
 The Wisdom of Gandhi
 The Odyssey of Enlightenment
 Worldwide Laws of Life

Manjul Publishings recently also translated Harry Potter and the Philosopher's Stone in Gujarati, a regional language of India. It was named as Harry Potter aur Parasmani. Manjul Publishings also translated Harry Potter novels in Marathi, Bengali and Malayalam.

Harry Potter books in Hindi 
In India, most children, especially those that live in cities and large towns, are quite familiar with Harry Potter and most of them buy the English Bloomsbury; but not all children can read international style English, and some knew the character only through movies dubbed into Hindi. They want to read the books in Hindi. To reach these children, Manjul Publications published Harry Potter books in simple Hindi. The magic spells are translated into Sanskrit for effect, echoing the fact that in the English edition, spells are rendered in Latin.
 According to Sudhir Dixit, who translated the books:

The book covers of the Hindi series are identical to the covers of the American Scholastic edition, as stipulated by the rights owners.

See also 
Harry Potter in translation

References

 na

Harry Potter in translation
Organisations based in Bhopal
Book publishing companies of India
Publishing companies established in 1999
1999 establishments in Madhya Pradesh
Companies based in Madhya Pradesh